This is a list of listed buildings in East Dunbartonshire. The list is split out by parish.

 List of listed buildings in Baldernock, East Dunbartonshire
 List of listed buildings in Bearsden, East Dunbartonshire
 List of listed buildings in Bishopbriggs, East Dunbartonshire
 List of listed buildings in Cadder, East Dunbartonshire
 List of listed buildings in Campsie, East Dunbartonshire
 List of listed buildings in Kirkintilloch, East Dunbartonshire
 List of listed buildings in Milngavie, East Dunbartonshire
 List of listed buildings in New Kilpatrick, East Dunbartonshire

East Dunbartonshire